Lloyd Patterson (born March 26, 1957) is a former American football quarterback who played one season with the Saskatchewan Roughriders of the Canadian Football League. He played college football at Memphis State University. His son Lloyd also played for the Memphis Tigers.

References

External links
Just Sports Stats
College stats

Living people
1957 births
American football quarterbacks
Canadian football quarterbacks
African-American players of American football
African-American players of Canadian football
Memphis Tigers football players
Saskatchewan Roughriders players
21st-century African-American people
20th-century African-American sportspeople